Max Ornstil (born February 24, 1994) is an American soccer player.

Career

Amateur & College
Ornstil spent four years playing college soccer at Santa Clara University between 2012 and 2015, where he scored 5 goals in 74 appearances for the Broncos, also tallying 3 assists.

Ornstil also appeared for USL PDL side FC Tucson in 2013 and 2014, and Portland Timbers U23s in 2016 after finishing college.

Professional 
Ornstil signed with United Soccer League side Portland Timbers 2 in March 2017.

On December 1, 2020, Ornstil joined USL Championship side Oakland Roots ahead of the 2021 season. He left Oakland following their 2022 season.

Personal life

He was born and raised in Oakland, California. He went to St. Paul's Episcopal School for elementary and middle school and played for local youth team East Bay United/Bay Oaks.

References

External links
Santa Clara bio
Timbers bio

1994 births
Living people
American soccer players
Association football defenders
FC Tucson players
Portland Timbers U23s players
Portland Timbers 2 players
Santa Clara Broncos men's soccer players
Soccer players from California
Sportspeople from Oakland, California
USL League Two players
USL Championship players
Oakland Roots SC players
De Anza Force players